Marquis Roberto d’Azeglio (1790–1862) was an Italian painter.

Life
Born in Turin, he painted historical works in the manner of Gaudenzio Ferrari. He was the brother of Marquis Massimo d'Azeglio. He became director of the Turin Gallery, and wrote several books on art. He died in his birthplace. The diplomat Vittorio Emanuele Taparelli d'Azeglio was his son.

References

Sources

1790 births
1862 deaths
Painters from Turin
19th-century Italian painters
Italian male painters
19th-century Italian male artists